Lykaio may refer to:
 Mount Lykaion, Greece
 Lykaio (town), Greece